Gary Allen Wiggins, known as "Detroit" Gary Wiggins (November 10, 1952 – November 22, 2020) was an American musician.

Biography
Born in Inkster, Michigan, United States, while he was still an infant his family moved to the west side of Detroit, on Oregon Street, where he was raised. His late mother, Ruth Russell Wiggins (1920-1999), reared him in the church where he began to perform on the saxophone with Brother Lawhorn in 1962. He attended Northwestern High School until 1970, and played in a jazz band while attending community college.

At age 14, he played in Bobo Jenkins Blues Band, in  Detroit. Wiggins made his first recorded release "That Good Old Funky Feeling" on 45rpm at the age of 17 with his band, The Impacs.

The Impacs were a backing band for several of the Detroit R&B vocal groups such as the Dramatics. After touring with the Dramatics and performing in such places as the Apollo in Harlem, the T.P. Warner Theater in Washington D.C. and tours through Panama, and the eastern coast of North America, he headed west and camped in California for five years. During this time he performed with musicians such as Eddie Shaw, Eddie "Cleanhead" Vinson, Johnny Heartsman, Roy Brown, Big Mama Thornton, and many other musicians on the West Coast music scene.

In 1982, he spent a year in the Chicago blues scene where he played in the bands of the late Lefty Dizz, Sunnyland Slim, Johnny Littlejohn and Sugar Blue. and they released three vinyls.

Since moving to Europe in 1983 and in addition to producing several music concerts for Jazz Clubs and Festivals, he has toured with Charlie Musselwhite, Arnett Cobb, Screaming Jay Hawkins Jimmy Rogers, Johnny Copeland, Big Jay McNeely (Saxomania Tour, Europe), Katie Webster,  Scott Hamilton, Louisiana Red and Carey Bell.

He joined the Ray Charles show in Germany twice, and went to Japan. In Osnabrueck, Germany, Rannenberg and Wiggins founded the Pink Piano Jam Sessions (where Arnett Cobb's last performance was recorded) and, after moving to Berlin, he continued inviting international stars to the Berlin Blues Café.

Wiggins played in the A-Trane International Jazz Club Berlin - that announced him as "one of the most important american Saxophonists living in Europe", – for more than 20 years, as well as Europe's oldest jazz club in Paris Le Caveau de las Huchette.

The International Blues Duo produced and released three albums, and Wiggins has recorded with, among others, Bobby McFerrin, Robert Covington, and Roy Gaines.

Wiggins won the Berlin Jazz & Blues Award in 2002 and the German Preis der Deutschen Schallplattenkritik 1994 for Acoustic Soul, as well as appearing on the Gong Show in 1977 with Rick Murphy and David Winans as The Show Bizz Kids. In his latter years he started acrylic painting and undertook several art projects.

Wiggins died on November 22, 2020n in Bissingen an der Teck, South Germany, at the age of 68.

Discography
 Introducing The International Blues Duo To The World (1984)
 The International Blues Duo Meets Blues Wire - Truly International (1987 / 2014)
 Bobby McFerrin feat. Detroit Gary Wiggins: Bobby's Thing and Lady Fair  (1988)
 The International Blues Duo Featuring Katie Webster (1989)
 Time For Saxin’ (1990)
 Detroit Gary Wiggins & C.C. the Boogieman: Acoustic Soul (1992)
 I Got Up (1996)
 Fabrice Eulry & Detroit Gary Wiggins: Paris Jook (1996)
 Ballads in a Diplomatic Lounge (2004)
 Zeitlos (2005)
 Saxin’ the Blues (2011)

As a side-person
 Lefty Dizz & Shock Treatment: Live in Chicago (1982/2008)
 Klaus Lage: Schweissperlen (1985)  
 Johnny Heartsman: Sacramento (1987)
 Roy Gaines: Going Home to See Mama (1987)
 Angela Brown: Live (1993)
 The Gospel Messengers: Lean on Me (1996)  
 EB Davis: Fool for the Ladies (1996) with Big Jay Mc Neely  
 Siggy Davis: Live (2013)
 Jimmie Smith: Timemension (1983)
 The Cat - several albums
 Errol Dixon: Mr. Boogie Woogie
 Robert Covington: The Golden Voice of Robert Covington (1987)  
 The Dramatics: What You See is What You Get (1972)
 Jimmy Scott: A Pair and a Spair (1973)  
 Cindy Rickmond: New Ideas (1990)

References

External links

 Detroit Gary Wiggins - Artist's Website
 Website The International Blues Duo
 Gary Wiggins at the Encyclopedia of Jazz Musicians at Jazz.com
 
 
 Detroit Gary Wiggins Gary Wiggins at the archives of Deutsche Nationalbibliothek, Frankfurt a. Main, Germany
 Detroit Gary Wiggins at the Library of Congress, Washington
 Detroit Gary Wiggins at the "Blues Archive of The University of Mississippi Digital Collections", Oxford, USA
 Detroit Gary Wiggins at the  Bibliothèque Nationale de France, Paris, France
 Detroit Gary Wiggins NUKAT, Union Catalog of Polish Research Libraries, Warsaw, Poland
 Detroit Gary Wiggins at SLUB, Sächsische Landesbibliothek - Staats- und Universitätsbibliothek Dresden, Germany
 The DGW Interview from 2002.  
 Blues Blues Photograph Collection, The Blues Archive University of Mississippi Digital Collections
 Press Articles from US Press, France, Netherlands, Denmark, Germany 
 Chicago Reader: The  Golden Voice of Richard Covington - with "Detroit Gary Wiggins".
 Ingrid Montgomery-Swinton, Go Red Go, Blow Arnett Blow: The life of Arnett Cobb. Ingrid Montgomery-Swinton, Lizette Cobb, p. 3
 Gary Wiggins at Berlin Dialogues - CES Center for European Studies Harvard University, Berlin
 Arnett Cobbs Last Recorded Concert at the Pink Piano with Gary Wiggins and a Spoken Word by Arnett Cobb
 Video of Big Jay McNeely & "Detroit" Gary Wiggins 
 The Pink Piano Osnabrueck 1986. 
 Uwe Manzke: Blues in Deutschland, Bluessource.com
 Verlagsgruppe Rhein Main GmbH & Co. KG: Tommy Schneller beim SWR-Summertime Blues - Allgemeine Zeitung. 
 Wolfgang Peter: Kurhaus Baden-Baden - The Night of the Saxophones. 
 Gary at Caveau de La Huchette, Paris 
 Detroit Gary Wiggins discography at All About Jazz
 Dany Doriz, Christian Mars: 60 Ans de jazz au Caveau de la Huchette. Hrsg.: Cabu. L'Archipel, Paris 2008, S. 86–87.
 Interview "Detroit" Gary Wiggins by Frau Julie Bennett Hume's Podcast, Berlin, 2011

1952 births
Living people
African-American jazz musicians
American blues singers
American funk saxophonists
American male saxophonists
American jazz soprano saxophonists
American rhythm and blues musicians
American soul musicians
Chicago blues musicians
Detroit blues musicians
Jazz-blues saxophonists
Members of the Church of God in Christ
Musicians from Chicago
Singers from Detroit
21st-century American saxophonists
Jazz musicians from Illinois
Jazz musicians from Michigan
21st-century American male musicians
American male jazz musicians